Isabella Romola de' Medici (31 August 1542 – 16 July 1576) was the daughter of Cosimo I de' Medici, first Grand Duke of Tuscany, and Eleonora di Toledo. She was raised and educated in a humanist manner with her siblings, including Francesco de' Medici who succeeded their father as the Grand Duke of Tuscany. To secure a relationship with the powerful Roman Orsinis, Isabella's father arranged her marriage to Paolo Giordano I Orsini when she was 16. She remained in her father's household after her marriage, giving her an unusual degree of independence for a woman of her period. Following the death of her father, Isabella was probably murdered, with the complicity of her husband and brother, and in retribution for her relationship with Paolo Giordano's cousin Troilo Orsini.

Biography
 

Isabella was born in Florence where, with her brothers and sisters, she lived first in the Palazzo Vecchio and later in the Palazzo Pitti, spending much of her time as a child at father's ancestral country home, Villa di Castello. The Medici children were educated at home by tutors in a range of subjects such as classics, languages, and arts. From an early age Isabella showed a great love for music, which in her adulthood she used as means for self-expression, according to biographer Caroline Murphy.  A great beauty, she had a lively, high-spirited and impulsive character that was commented on by courtiers.

In 1553, at age 11 Isabella was betrothed to 12-year-old Paolo Giordano Orsini, in line for the Duchy of Bracciano in southern Tuscany, a liaison Isabella's father felt necessary to secure his southern border and his relationship with the ancient Roman Orsini family. The two married in 1558, in a semi-private ceremony, at Villa di Castello. Paolo left the following day. Concerned by the spending habits of his new son-in-law, Cosimo decided to keep his daughter and her 50,000 scudi dowry  in Florence, giving her greater freedom and control over her own affairs than was customary for Florentine women of the time. 

Following her mother's death, she acted as first lady of Florence for a time, displaying the de' Medici aptitude for politics. She suffered several miscarriages and remained childless until her late twenties. Her daughter Francesca Eleonora (known as Nora), was born in 1571 and eventually married her cousin Alessandro Sforza. Her son Virginio was born in 1572 and eventually inherited his father's dukedom. 

Isabella's free-spirited personality created rumours with regard to the nature of her relationship with Troilo Orsini, Paolo Giordano's cousin, who was charged with looking after her while her husband tended to military duties. 

On 16 July 1576 Isabella died unexpectedly at the Medici villa in Cerreto Guidi during a hunting holiday. According to her brother, the grandduke, this occurred "while she was washing her hair in the morning ... She was found by Signor Paolo Giordano on her knees, having immediately fallen dead." However, the official version of events was not generally believed, and the Ferrarese ambassador, Ercole Cortile, obtained information that Isabella was "strangled at midday" by her husband in the presence of several named servants. Isabella was the second sudden death in an isolated country villa in the Medici family, her cousin Leonora, having died of a similar "accident" only a few days before. Most historians assume that Paolo Giordano killed Isabella, in reprisal for carrying on a love affair with Troilo Orsini, or that he acted on instructions of the Grandduke Francesco, Isabella's brother. One scholar, Elisabetta Mori, has argued that Isabella de' Medici died of natural causes and that the rumour that Paolo Giordano murdered her was spread by enemies of the Medici.

Issue 
After several miscarriages, by her husband Isabella had two daughters and a son:
 Francesca Eleonora Orsini (d. 1634). She married Alessandro Sforza, Duke of Segni.
 Isabella Orsini (1571 - 1572).
 Virginio Orsini (1572 - 1615). II Duke of Bracciano.

Art
Various paintings are extant, by Alessandro Allori (see above). Another painting with a right profile, also attributed to Allori, is owned by the Carnegie Museum of Art and has been uncovered and refurbished in 2014, having had a Victorian era face painted over.

Ancestry

Notes

References

Langdon, Gabrielle. Medici Women: Portraits of Power, Love, and Betrayal in the Court of Duke Cosimo I. University of Toronto Press, 2006.
Mori, Elisabetta (2011): L'onore perduto di Isabella de' Medici. Garzanti. 
Murphy, Caroline P. Murder of a Medici Princess. Oxford: Oxford University Press, 2008. 
Reiss, Sheryl; Wilkins, David. Beyond Isabella: Secular women patrons of art in Renaissance Italy. Truman State University Press, 2001. 

1542 births
1576 deaths
Nobility from Florence
Isabella
Assassinated Italian people
16th-century Italian nobility
Isabella de' Medici
Murdered royalty
Renaissance women
16th-century Italian women
Daughters of monarchs